Ergodic Theory and Dynamical Systems is a peer-reviewed mathematics journal published by Cambridge University Press.
Established in 1981, the journal publishes articles on dynamical systems.
The journal is indexed by Mathematical Reviews and Zentralblatt MATH.
Its 2009 impact factor was 0.822.

External links

Mathematics journals
Publications established in 1981
English-language journals
Cambridge University Press academic journals